The year 1909 in archaeology involved some significant events.

Explorations
 Discovery of the Burgess Shale Cambrian fossil site in the Canadian Rockies by palaeontologist Charles Walcott of the Smithsonian Institution.

Excavations
 Excavation of Calleva Atrebatum (Silchester Roman Town) in England by the Society of Antiquaries of London completed (begun in 1890).
 Excavations at Ritsona in Boeotia by Ronald Burrows and Percy and Annie Ure of the American School of Classical Studies at Athens begin (completed in 1922).
 Excavations at Villa of Mysteries at Pompeii begin.
 At Knap Hill in Wiltshire, England, the first excavation of a causewayed enclosure, by Ben and Maud Cunnington, is completed (begun in 1908).

Finds
Betatakin ruins discovered by Byron Cummings

Miscellaneous
 The National Trust purchases White Barrow on Salisbury Plain in England, its first archaeological site.

Births
 January 8 – Nikolaos Platon, Greek archaeologist (d. 1992)
 December 10 – Robert Wauchope, American archaeologist and anthropologist (d. 1979)
 Su Bingqi, Chinese archaeologist (d. 1997)

References

Archaeology
Archaeology
Archaeology by year